I Tawt I Taw a Puddy Tat is a 2011 American 3D computer-animated Looney Tunes short film featuring the characters Tweety, Sylvester, and Granny. It is an adaptation of the 1950 song "I Taut I Taw a Puddy Tat" sung by Mel Blanc. It features the voice of June Foray as Granny and Blanc's archive recordings taken from the song for Sylvester and Tweety. I Tawt I Taw a Puddy Tat was first shown in theaters before Warner Bros.' feature-length film Happy Feet Two. In 2014, Warner Bros. Animation published this short on YouTube.

Plot
Inside Granny's apartment, while Granny is asleep, Tweety sings about his life at home and about Sylvester, who always wants to eat him.

Voice cast
 Mel Blanc (via archival recordings) as Tweety and Sylvester
 Joe Alaskey (screaming) as Sylvester
 June Foray as Granny

Release
The short was released theatrically with Happy Feet Two. It was attached as a special feature on the Happy Feet Two DVD and Blu-ray.

It was also included as a bonus on the DVD release of Looney Tunes: Rabbits Run.

References

External links

I Tawt I Taw a Puddy Tat on YouTube

2011 films
2011 3D films
2011 short films
2011 comedy films
2011 computer-animated films
2010s American animated films
2010s animated short films
2010s musical comedy films
American 3D films
Computer-animated short films
American children's animated musical films
3D animated short films
Looney Tunes shorts
Sylvester the Cat films
Tweety films
Films set in apartment buildings
Short films directed by Matthew O'Callaghan
Films scored by Christopher Lennertz
Warner Bros. Animation animated short films
2010s Warner Bros. animated short films
Reel FX Creative Studios short films
Films with screenplays by Matthew O'Callaghan
2010s English-language films